Devapriya is both a given name and a surname. Notable people with the name include:

Devapriya Roy (born 1984), Indian author
Isura Devapriya, Sri Lankan politician
Hemantha Devapriya (born 1958), Sri Lankan cricketer

Sinhalese surnames